The Eden County, also known as the County of Eden was one of the counties of New Zealand. Established in 1876, the county covered the rural areas of the Auckland isthmus. The county gradually shrunk in size as the city of Auckland grew, and suburban areas became boroughs.

History 

The County of Eden was established in 1842. It was replaced in 1849 by Governor William Hobson with a system of Hundreds, and reinstated in 1876.

The county did not administer the area in the way local government does, instead was primarily used as a way to order land division and sales. In 1862, the Highways Act empowered local communities to form Road Boards and Highway Districts to administer areas, and by 1867 there were 20 highway districts in Eden County. Unlike most other counties in New Zealand, the Eden County devolved most of its administrative power and function to the highway and road boards for most of fits existence.

The first boroughs to secede from Eden County were Parnell and Onehunga in 1877, followed by Newmarket and Newton (later renamed Grey Lynn Borough) in 1885. These boroughs were joined by Mount Eden in 1906, Avondale in 1922, One Tree Hill in 1930 and Ellerslie in 1938.

The Eden County was amalgamated into Auckland City in 1940. With the local government reforms of 1989, all of the former territory of the county was incorporated into Auckland City.

See also 
 List of former territorial authorities in New Zealand § Counties

References

Counties of New Zealand
Politics of the Auckland Region
1842 establishments in New Zealand
1940 disestablishments in New Zealand
Former subdivisions of the Auckland Region